Krabbe is a surname, and may refer to:

People
Anne Krabbe (1552–1618), Danish writer
Ewa Pihl Krabbe (born 1947), Swedish politician
Felix Krabbe (born 1978), German yacht racer
Frederik Krabbe (born 1988), Danish football player
Frederik Michael Krabbe (1725–1796) Danish shipbuilder
Gregers Krabbe (1594–1655), Danish-born nobleman and landowner
Hugo Krabbe (1857–1936), Dutch jurist and legal philosopher
Iver Krabbe (1602–1666), Danish nobleman and military officer
Jörgen Krabbe (1633–1678), Danish-Swedish lawyer and nobleman
Karen Iversdatter Krabbe (1637–1702), Danish noblewoman
Katrin Krabbe (born 1969), German female athlete
Knud Krabbe (1885–1961), Danish neurologist
Niels Krabbe (born 1951), ornithologist and bird conservationist
Nikolay Karlovich Krabbe (1814–1876), admiral of the Russian Imperial Navy

See also
Krabbe disease, degenerative disorder that affects the myelin sheath of the nervous system
Krabbé